Peter Duryea (July 14, 1939 – March 24, 2013) was an American actor. He is best known for appearing in a pilot episode of Star Trek: The Original Series, "The Cage" (1964). Most of his scenes which was reused in "The Menagerie" (1966). His father, Dan Duryea, was also an actor.

Early life and career 
Peter Duryea was born in Los Angeles in 1939. He studied math and physics at Amherst College in Massachusetts before discovering acting.

Duryea played Lieutenant Jose Tyler in the original Star Trek pilot episode, "The Cage." He also appeared in The Fugitive, The Outer Limits, Dr. Kildare, Daniel Boone, Bewitched, I Spy and Family Affair.

Tipi Camp 
Peter Duryea was the head of a non-profit society called Guiding Hands Recreation Society which hosted a peaceful getaway called the Tipi Camp. Located in the West Kootenay area of British Columbia, Canada, the camp opened in 1988. Groups and individuals book time at the Tipi Camp to reflect in a gentle collection of tipis along an idyllic lake. The camp sees about 300 visitors annually.

People travel from all over North America to participate in many of the different programs available at the Tipi Camp. Some of the more popular programs are the "W.I.S.E Camp" (Wilderness Immersion for Self-Esteem) and the annual Yoga Retreats. The "W.I.S.E Camp" is intended for teenagers and emphasizes self-respect, respect for others and respect for the environment. The closest town is Nelson.

Personal life
Peter Duryea moved to Kootenay Lake in British Columbia in the 1970s.

Duryea died at his home on March 24, 2013, aged 73, from undisclosed causes.

Filmography 

 The Defenders (1964, TV Series)
 episode: Survival .... Collier
 The Carpetbaggers (1964) .... Assistant director (uncredited)
 The Outer Limits (1964, TV Series)
 episode: Expanding Human .... Morrow
 Kraft Suspense Theatre (1964, TV Series)
 episode: A Lion Amongst Men .... Victor Palchek
 Taggart (1964) .... Rusty Bob Blazer
 Dr. Kildare (1965, TV Series)
 episode: Lullaby for an Indian Summer .... Larry
 Daniel Boone (1965, TV Series)
 episode: The Sound of Fear .... Andrew Perigore (appeared with his father Dan Duryea)
 The Bounty Killer (1965) .... Youth
 Bewitched (1965, TV Series)
 episode: The Magic Cabin .... Charles McBain
 Lt. Robin Crusoe, U.S.N. (1966) .... Co-pilot
 The Virginian (1966, TV Series) 
 episode: Jacob Was a Plain Man .... Nicky
 Bob Hope Presents the Chrysler Theatre (1965-1966, TV Series)
 episode: Massacre at Fort Phil Kearney .... First Soldier
 episode: A Time for Killing .... Jimmy
 Twelve O'Clock High (1964-1966, TV Series) 
 episode: The Pariah .... Staff Sgt. Hunter
 episode: Decision .... Lt. Peters
 Combat! (1965-1967, TV Series)
 episode: Jonah .... Simmons
 episode: The Linesman .... Pvt. O'Connor
 Star Trek: The Original Series (1966, TV Series)
 episode: The Cage .... Lieutenant Jose Tyler (final appearance)
 Catalina Caper (1967) .... Tad Duval
 I Spy (1968, TV Series)
 episode: Tag, You're It .... Halsey
 Gomer Pyle, U.S.M.C. (1968, TV Series)
 episode: Gomer, the Perfect M.P. .... Ben Derzansky
 The Name of the Game (1969, TV Series)
 episode: Swinger's Only .... Photographer
 Adam-12 (1969, TV Series)
 episode: Log 62: Grand Theft Horse? .... Charles Carter
 Dragnet 1967 (1967-1969, TV Series)
 episode: Intelligence - DR-34 ....s Paul Reed
 episode: Internal Affairs - DR-20.... John Meadows
 episode: The Trial Board .... Ted Clover
 Blood of the Iron Maiden (1970) .... Peter
 Family Affair (1971, TV Series)
 episode: Cinder-Emily .... Jim Turner
 episode: Too Late, Too Soon .... Jim Turner
 Insight (1972-1976, TV Series)
 episode: Ride a Turquoise Pony (1972).... Bruce
 episode: Reunited (1976).... Bruce

References

External links
 

 
 Dan Duryea Central: Remembering Peter Duryea

1939 births
2013 deaths
Canadian emigrants to the United States
American male film actors
American male television actors
Male actors from Los Angeles
People from the Regional District of Central Kootenay